Notes Towards an African Orestes is a 1970 Italian film by director Pier Paolo Pasolini about Pasolini's preparations for making a film version of the Oresteia set in Africa.

The film starts as a cinematic notebook of Pasolini scouting locations and actors with a voice-over of his thoughts -- "perhaps this will be my Electra".  Back in Rome, there is a sequence with a jazz group playing. He then invites a group of African students at the University of Rome to review his notes and comment.  They politely but clearly tell Pasolini that the primeval Africa he imagined had little to do with the complex, diverse reality and that treating it as a primal setting for an ancient European story was foolish. They appear to be amusedly patronised by Pasolini's implication that social progress in Africa via the adoption of Western education systems should be distrusted in favour of his romanticised ideals of communal tribal systems and the dignity of labour.

The African Orestes was never made. It is implied towards the end of the documentary that Pasolini himself was having doubts concerning his own idea.

The film was screened at the 1976 Cannes Film Festival, but was not entered into the main competition.

Cast 
 Gato Barbieri - Himself - Musician: saxophone
 Don Moye - Himself - Musician: drums
 Marcello Melio - Himself - Musician: contrabasse
 Yvonne Murray (singer) - Herself - singer
 Archie Savage - Himself - Singer
 Pier Paolo Pasolini - Himself (uncredited)

References

External links

1970 films
1970s Italian-language films
Italian documentary films
Films directed by Pier Paolo Pasolini
Italian black-and-white films
1970 documentary films
Documentary films about films
Films based on classical mythology
1970s unfinished films
Autobiographical documentary films
Documentary films about African cinema
Aeschylus
1970s Italian films